British Sign Language  (BSL) is a sign language used in the United Kingdom (UK), and is the first or preferred language among the Deaf community in the UK. Based on the percentage of people who reported 'using British Sign Language at home' on the 2011 Scottish Census, the British Deaf Association estimates there are 151,000 BSL users in the UK, of which 87,000 are Deaf. By contrast, in the 2011 England and Wales Census 15,000 people living in England and Wales reported themselves using BSL as their main language. People who are not deaf may also use BSL, as hearing relatives of deaf people, sign language interpreters or as a result of other contact with the British Deaf community. The language makes use of space and involves movement of the hands, body, face, and head.

History

The Beginning 
BSL is a creation of the British Deaf community, who have experienced discrimination over many centuries. All sign languages have origins in gestural communication developed between deaf children and hearing adults. Unlike home sign, which does not pass between generations, sign languages are shared by a large community of signers.

Records show the existence of a sign language within deaf communities in England as far back as the 15th century. The History of the Syon Monastery at Lisbon and Brentford, published in 1450, contains descriptions of signs — some of which are still in use. The earliest documented use of sign language is the registry records of a marriage ceremony between Thomas Tilsye and Ursula Russel in 1576.

Richard Carew's Survey of Cornwall (1602) includes a vivid description of Edward Bone, a deaf servant, meeting his deaf friend Kempe. Bone had some knowledge of Cornish and was able to lipread, but appeared to prefer signing. Carew described the situation thus:Somewhat neerre the place of his [Bone's] birth, there dwelt another, so affected, or rather defected, whose name was Kempe: which two, when they chaunced to meete, would use such kinde embracements, such stranfe, often, and earnest tokenings, and such heartie laughtes, and other passionate gestures, that their want of a tongue, seemed rather an hinderance to other conveiving [understanding] them, then to their conceiving one another.John Bulwer, who had an adopted deaf daughter Chirothea Johnson, authored four late-Renaissance texts related to deafness, sign language and the human body: Chirologia (1644), Philocopus (1648), Pathomyotamia (1649) and Anthropometamorphosis (1650). In particular, Chirologia focuses on the meanings of gestures, expressions and body language, and describes signs and gestures in use at the time, some of which resemble signs still in use, while Philocopus explores the use of lipreading by deaf people and the possibility of deaf education, and is dedicated to Bulwer's two deaf brothers.

Another writer of the same time, George Dalgarno, recognised that sign language was unrelated to English. In 1661 he wrote that "The deaf man has no teacher at all and through necessity may put him upon... using signs, yet those have no affinity to the language by which they that are about him do converse among themselves."

Finally, the diarist Samuel Pepys described a conversation between George Downing and a deaf boy in November 1666:But, above all, there comes in the dumb boy that I knew in Oliver's time, who is mightily acquainted here, and with Downing; and he made strange signs of the fire, and how the King was abroad, and many things they understood, but I could not...British Sign Language has evolved, as all languages do, from these origins by modification, invention and importation.

Early Deaf Education

The Braidwood schools 
Thomas Braidwood, a teacher from Edinburgh, founded 'Braidwood's Academy for the Deaf and Dumb' in 1760, which is believed to be the first school for deaf children in Britain. The school primarily taught oral communication methods, as described by Francis Green - whose son attended the Braidwood school - in the anonymous treatise Vox oculis subjecta. In this account, Green describes how his son Charles would surely develop "a perfect acquaintance with language both oral and written", and how deaf pupils were given "a tolerable general understanding of their own language [English] so as to read, write, and speak it, with ease". Green also describes Braidwood's views of spoken language:Mr Braidwood hath frequently intimated to me, as an opinion founded upon his experience in this art, that articulate or spoken language hath so great and essential a tendency to confirm and enlarge ideas, above the power of written language, that it is almost impossible for deaf persons, without the use of speech, to be perfect in their ideas.Joseph Watson was trained as a teacher of the deaf under Thomas Braidwood. He eventually left in 1792 to become the headmaster of the Asylum for the Deaf and Dumb in Bermondsey. He described his teaching methods in detail in his book, On the Education of the Deaf and Dumb (1809), where he opposed the use of signed versions of spoken language such as the Signed French used in the Paris school. The book contains lists of vocabulary and plates designed to encourage a child to acquire an understanding of written and spoken language.

International links 
Although the Braidwood school focused on speech, it also used an early form of sign language, the combined system, which was the first codification of British Sign Language. The Braidwood school later moved to London and was visited by Abbé Sicard and Laurent Clerc in 1815, at the same time that an American Protestant minister, Thomas Hopkins Gallaudet, travelled to Europe to research teaching of deaf people.

André-Daniel Laffon de Ladebat, one of the French visitors to the Braidwood school, provided a vivid description of Laurent Clerc's meeting with the deaf children in the bilingual English/French book, A collection of the Most Remarkable Definitions and Answers of Massieu and Clerc, Deaf and Dumb. Laurent Clerc, who was deaf, was overjoyed to find fellow sign language users:As soon as Clerc beheld this sight [of the children at dinner] his face became animated; he was as agitated as a traveller of sensibility would be on meeting all of a sudden in distant regions, a colony of his own countrymen... Clerc approached them. He made signs and they answered him by signs. The unexpected communication cause a most delicious sensation in them and for us was a scene of expression and sensibility that gave us the most heart-felt satisfaction.The Braidwood schools refused to teach Gallaudet their methods. Gallaudet then travelled to Paris and learned the educational methods of the French Royal Institution for the Deaf, a combination of Old French Sign Language and the signs developed by Abbé de l'Épée. As a consequence American Sign Language today has a 60% similarity to modern French Sign Language and is almost unintelligible to users of British Sign Language. Gallaudet went on to establish the American School for the Deaf in 1817, which focused on manual communication and ASL, in contrast to the oral methods used in the UK.

Late 19th - 21st Century 
Until the 1940s, sign language skills were passed between deaf people without a unified sign language system; many said people were living in residential institutions. Signing was actively discouraged in schools by punishment, and deaf education emphasised teaching deaf children to learn to lip read and finger spell. From the 1970s there has been an increasing tolerance and instruction in BSL in schools. The language continues to evolve as older signs such as alms and pawnbroker have fallen out of use and new signs such as internet and laser have been coined. The evolution of the language and its changing level of acceptance means that older users tend to rely on finger spelling while younger ones make use of a wider range of signs.

Paddy Ladd initiated deaf programming on British television in the 1980s and is credited with getting sign language on television and enabling deaf children to be educated in sign.

BSL users campaigned to have BSL recognised on an official level. Police and Criminal Evidence Act 1984 mandates the provision of interpreters. On 18 March 2003 the UK government formally recognised that BSL is a language in its own right. In 2021, Rosie Cooper introduced the British Sign Language Bill to recognise BSL as an official language, which was backed by the government. After being dormant from June 2021, the bill began moving through Parliament on 28 January 2022, but during a meeting with stakeholders on 7 February, the language of the bill was revealed to have been pared down substantially, disappointing said stakeholders. The British Deaf Association stated that it was 'unhappy' with this removal of language from the bill.

Linguistics 
Linguistics is the study of language, including those like BSL that are not carried by sound. In all sign languages the great majority of 'words' (hand gestures) cannot be understood in other sign languages. How one language signs a certain number would be different than how another language signs it. The way sentences are constructed (syntax) differs from sign language to sign language, just as with different spoken languages. British Sign Language is described as a 'spatial language' as it "moves signs in space."

Phonology 
Like many other sign languages, BSL phonology is defined by elements such as handshape, orientation, location, movement, and non-manual features. There are phonological components to sign language that have no meaning alone but work together to create a meaning of a signed word: hand shape, movement, location, orientation and facial expression. The meanings of words differ if one of these components is changed. Signs can be identical in certain components but different in others, giving each a different meaning. Facial expression falls under the nonmanual feature component of phonology. These include "eyebrow height, eye gaze, mouthing, head movement, and torso rotation."

Grammar 
In common with other languages, whether spoken or signed, BSL has its own grammar which govern how phrases are signed. BSL has a particular syntax. One important component of BSL is its use of proforms. A proform is "...any form that stands in the place of, or does the job of, some other form." Sentences are composed of two parts, in order: the subject and the predicate. The subject is the topic of the sentence, while the predicate is the commentary about the subject.

BSL uses a topic–comment structure. Topic-comment means that the topic of the signed conversation is first established, followed by an elaboration of the topic, being the 'comment' component. The canonical word order outside of the topic–comment structure is object–subject–verb (OSV), and noun phrases are head-initial.

Relationships with other sign languages 

Although the United Kingdom and the United States share English as the predominant oral language, British Sign Language is quite distinct from American Sign Language (ASL) - having only 31% signs identical, or 44% cognate. BSL is also distinct from Irish Sign Language (ISL) (ISG in the ISO system) which is more closely related to French Sign Language (LSF) and ASL.

It is also distinct from Signed English, a manually coded method expressed to represent the English language.

The sign languages used in Australia and New Zealand, Auslan and New Zealand Sign Language respectively, evolved largely from 19th century BSL, and all retain the same manual alphabet and grammar and possess similar lexicons. These three languages may technically be considered dialects of a single language (BANZSL) due to their use of the same grammar and manual alphabet and the high degree of lexical sharing (overlap of signs). The term BANZSL was coined by Trevor Johnston and Adam Schembri.

In Australia deaf schools were established by educated deaf people from London, Edinburgh and Dublin. This introduced the London and Edinburgh dialects of BSL to Melbourne and Sydney respectively and Irish Sign Language to Sydney in Roman Catholic schools for the deaf. The language contact post secondary education between Australian ISL users and 'Australian BSL' users accounts for some of the dialectal differences we see between modern BSL and Auslan. Tertiary education in the US for some deaf Australian adults also accounts for some ASL borrowings found in modern Auslan.

Auslan, BSL and NZSL have 82% of signs identical (using concepts from a Swadesh list). When considering similar or related signs as well as identical, they are 98% cognate. Further information will be available after completion of the BSL corpus, allows for comparison with the Auslan corpus, and the New Zealand Sign Language project. There continues to be language contact between BSL, Auslan and NZSL through migration (deaf people and interpreters), the media (television programmes such as See Hear, Switch, Rush and SignPost are often recorded and shared informally in all three countries) and conferences (the World Federation of the Deaf Conference – WFD – in Brisbane 1999 saw many deaf British people travelling to Australia).

Makaton, a communication system for people with cognitive impairments or other communication difficulties, was originally developed with signs borrowed from British Sign Language. The sign language used in Sri Lanka is also closely related to BSL despite the oral language not being English, demonstrating variation in distance between sign languages and spoken ones.

Usage 
BSL has many regional dialects. Certain signs used in Scotland, for example, may not be understood immediately, or not understood at all, by those in Southern England, or vice versa. Some signs are even more local, occurring only in certain towns or cities (such as the Manchester system of number signs). Likewise, some may go in or out of fashion, or evolve over time, just as terms in oral languages do. Families may have signs unique to them to accommodate for certain situations or to describe an object that may otherwise require fingerspelling.

Many British television channels broadcast programmes with in-vision signing, using BSL, as well as specially made programmes aimed mainly at deaf people such as the BBC's See Hear and Channel 4's VEE-TV.

BBC News broadcasts in-vision signing at 07:00-07:45, 08:00-08:20 and 13:00-13:45 GMT/BST each weekday. BBC Two also broadcasts in-vision signed repeats of the channel's primetime programmes between 00:00 and 02:00 each weekday. All BBC channels (excluding BBC One, BBC Alba and BBC Parliament) provide in-vision signing for some of their programmes. In 2020, 5.5% of Channel 4's programming was signed, including popular shows such as Hollyoaks and Gogglebox.

BSL is used in some educational establishments, but is not always the policy for deaf children in some local authority areas. The Let's Sign BSL and fingerspelling graphics are being developed for use in education by deaf educators and tutors and include many of the regional signs referred to above.

In Northern Ireland, there are about 4,500 users of BSL and 1,500 users of Irish Sign Language, an unrelated sign language. A hybrid version, dubbed "Northern Ireland Sign Language" is also used.

In 2019, over 100 signs for scientific terms, including 'deoxyribonucleotide' and 'deoxyribonucleoside', were added to BSL, after being conceived by Liam Mcmulkin, a deaf graduate of the University of Dundee, who had found finger-spelling such words tiresome, during his degree course.

Number of BSL users 
In 2016 the British Deaf Association (BDA)says that, based on official statistics, it believes there are 151,000 people who use BSL in the UK, and 87,000 of these are deaf. This figure does not include professional BSL users, interpreters, translators, etc. unless they use BSL at home.

British Sign Language Dictionary 
The British Sign Language Dictionary was compiled for the British Deaf Association by the Deaf Studies Research Unit at the University of Durham. It depicts over 1,800 signs through pictures and diagrams, each sign accompanied by definitions, explanations and usage. The signs are ordered not alphabetically, as a dictionary of the English language, but rather according to the phonological characteristics of the language. For example, signs that are based on the "fist" handshape come before signs based on the "open hand" handshape.

The dictionary was edited by David Brien, assisted by a team composed by Mary Brennan, Clark Denmark, Frances Elton, Liz Scoot Gibson, Graham Turner and Dorothy Miles, among others.

The Dictionary was published in 1992. The foreword was written by Princess Diana, who was the patron of the BDA.

Learning British Sign Language 
British Sign Language can be learnt from formal institutions throughout the UK and three examination systems exist.  Courses are provided by community colleges, local centres for deaf people and private organisations. A teaching qualification program was started by the British Deaf Association in 1984 at the University of Durham, called BSL Tutor Training Course, which closed in 1999.

National awarding organisations run training for BSL teachers. Each of these organisations have their own curricula, teaching materials and resources.

Becoming a BSL / English interpreter 
There are two qualification routes: via post-graduate studies, or via National Vocational Qualifications.  Deaf Studies undergraduate courses with specific streams for sign language interpreting exist at several British universities; post-graduate level interpreting diplomas are also on offer from universities and one private company. Course entry requirements vary from no previous knowledge of BSL to NVQ level 6 BSL (or equivalent).

The qualification process allows interpreters to register with the National Registers of Communication Professionals with Deaf and Deafblind People (NRCPD), a voluntary regulator. Registrants are asked to self-certify that they have both cleared a DBS (Disclosure and Barring Service) check and are covered by professional indemnity insurance. Completing a level 3 BSL language assessment and enrolling on an approved interpreting course allows applications to register as a TSLI (Trainee Sign Language Interpreter). After completing an approved interpreting course, trainees can then apply to achieve RSLI (Registered Sign Language Interpreter) status. RSLIs are currently required by NRCPD to log Continuous Professional Development activities. Post-qualification, specialist training is still considered necessary to work in specific critical domains.

Communication Support Workers 
Communication Support Workers (CSWs) are professionals who support the communication of deaf students in education at all ages, and deaf people in many areas of work, using British Sign Language and other communication methods such as Sign Supported English. The qualifications and experience of CSWs varies: some are fully qualified interpreters, others are not.

Let Sign Shine
Let Sign Shine is a campaign started by Norfolk teenager Jade Chapman to raise the awareness of British Sign Language (BSL) and attract signatures for a petition for BSL to be taught in schools. The campaign's petition to the Parliament of the United Kingdom has attracted support from over four thousand people.

Chapman was nominated for the Bernard Matthews Youth Award 2014 for her work and devotion to raising awareness of the importance of sign language. Chapman won the education award category and was presented with an award by Olympic swimmer Rebecca Adlington.

Chapman was also awarded an Outstanding Achievement Award from the Radio Norwich 99.9 Local Hero Awards on 7 October 2015. The award ceremony featured a performance by Alesha Dixon.

Having been donated £1,000 from the Bernard Matthews Youth Award, Let Sign Shine used this to start a British Sign Language course at Dereham Neatherd High School.

See also 
Languages in the United Kingdom
Makaton

References

External links 

 British Deaf Association Sign Language Resource
 BSL Sign Language Dictionary
 BSL SignBank 
 
 BSL Online Dictionary
 Information and Communication Technology Dictionary

 
Languages of the United Kingdom
BANZSL Sign Language family
Deaf culture in the United Kingdom
Languages of Scotland
Languages of Wales
Languages of England
Sign languages of the United Kingdom